Lynwood Lacey "Sonny" Easley (June 5, 1939 – January 15, 1978) was an American racecar driver who is best known for competing in the NASCAR Winston West Series and a handful of Winston Cup Series events.

Easley tallied nine Winston West victories over his career, including a victory in the first stock car race ever held at the Laguna Seca Raceway road course. He finished 2nd in Winston West points in 1973 and 1975.

In 19 career Cup starts, Easley had a best finish of 5th place at the January 16, 1977 Winston Western 500 at Riverside International Raceway.

During practice for a NASCAR modified sportsman race at Riverside on January 15, 1978, Easley was killed when his 1968 Camaro slid across the track into a trailer and pickup truck near pit road. A pit crew member for Tiny Keith, Douglas Grunst, was also killed in the incident.

Easley lived in Van Nuys, California.

Easley was a 2003 inductee into the West Coast Stock Car Hall of Fame.

References

External links
 Race Results, Ultimate Racing History
 

1939 births
1978 deaths
NASCAR drivers
People from Van Nuys, Los Angeles
Racing drivers from California
Racing drivers who died while racing
Sports deaths in California